A panorama portrait in photography and painting is the use of panoramic photography or imaging to convey a portrait of a person. It intends to be a bi-dimensional record of a 3D reality (experiences and  events related to the subject) where the whole environment is important, and therefore must be shown.

Panoramic photography is mostly used on landscapes. The approach to panorama portraits started when wanting to satisfy the needs depicting the whole surroundings of the artist and the subject, enhancing realism and placing the observer in a unique position of participation. A good example of it are paintings of El Greco like The Burial of the Count of Orgaz, The Parmigianino: Self-portrait in a convex Mirror, some of the engravings of M. C. Escher in the style of Fisheye Lens Portraits, or his Curvilinear Perspectives.

Information
The possibility to build the image in segments, as in segmented panoramic pictures, could bring the 4th dimension of time into a still image, as it takes time to record the amount of pictures needed to compose the whole work. Changes in weather, mood and even position of a model would create this effect. Some example of it is the work of the artist Michael Silvers, exhibited in the Bronx Latin American Art Biennial in New York in 2008.

Another completely different approach to panorama portrait is the Wraparound Face Texture Map, used commonly by 3D artists to provide a realistic texture and elements to be placed on 3D face models to create a highly realistic 3D virtual head.

External links
Charleston Art Gallery
Personal Artworks Website
"Workspaces" - a series of panorama-portraits by Mark-Steffen Goewecke

Portrait art
Panorama photography